Paudge Rodger Behan (born 18 January 1965) is an Irish actor and writer. The son of IRA Chief of Staff Cathal Goulding and Beatrice ffrench-Salkeld, the widow of playwright Brendan Behan, Paudge Behan worked briefly as a journalist for a Dublin newspaper before turning to acting. After a series of minor film and television roles in the 1990s, he was handpicked by English novelist Barbara Taylor Bradford to appear as the male lead in a 1999 dramatisation of her book A Secret Affair (1996).

Behan has also appeared in the feature films A Man of No Importance (1994), Conspiracy of Silence (2003) and Veronica Guerin (2003), and has taken leading roles in two short films, A Lonely Sky (2006) and Wake Up (2007).

Family and early life

Born in January 1965, Paudge Behan is the son of Cathal Goulding (1923–1998), Chief of Staff of the Irish Republican Army (IRA) and the Official IRA, and Beatrice Behan (née ffrench-Salkeld) (1925–1993). As a teenager, Goulding was involved with the IRA youth wing Fianna Éireann. After Brendan Behan's early death at the age of 41 on 20 March 1964, Goulding had Paudge Behan with Brendan's widow Beatrice. Paudge and his half-sister Blanaid grew up at 5 Anglesea Road, a red-brick, semi-detached late Victorian house in Ballsbridge, Dublin, which Brendan Behan bought for his wife Beatrice in 1959 for IR£1,400. The house came into Paudge Behan's ownership, and he sold it reluctantly for €1.65 million in February 2006.

Education and career
Before turning to acting, Behan had a brief career in journalism in Ireland: "I interviewed everyone from priests to prostitutes before my Dublin paper folded." Behan was also involved in theatre work – he was a costume assistant during the original production of Tom Murphy's adaptation of Liam O'Flaherty's 1925 novel The Informer on 13 October 1981 at the Olympia Theatre in Dublin. He participated in various other plays in Dublin, but finding them "all very over the top, very amateurish, full of people turning up drunk or not turning up at all", he decided to leave Ireland and pursue art studies in Berlin.

However, Behan found he could not concentrate on his art in Germany as he was working too hard in the evenings in nightclubs and bars to earn money. Also, as he was doing "too much drinking as well, so unless I wanted to start a new art style where it would've been very 'shakey' [sic] to look at, basically I decided I had to do something else". He resolved to go to London to study acting. After applying to three drama schools he was accepted by the Royal Academy of Dramatic Art (RADA). For about three years from 1990 or 1991, he lived with his friends from RADA, David Harewood and Danny Cerqueira, at 39 Ravenshaw Street in West Hampstead. Harewood recalls that his housemates were "fantastic characters" – "It was a wonderful, experimental time. We'd spend long nights discussing art, life and politics; smoking weed, drinking lots of whisky, listening to music and throwing furniture on the fire."

On 15 May 1991 at Dublin's Abbey Theatre, Behan played the lead character Connolly in the original production of Tom Murphy's play The Patriot Game, which charted the events of the Easter Rising of 1916. He also acted as a thug in the comedy film London Kills Me (1991); and made an appearance in the TV film Anglo-Saxon Attitudes (1992), based on the 1956 satirical novel by Angus Wilson. Other TV roles included characters in episodes of Highlander: The Series (1995) and The New Adventures of Robin Hood (1997). He was subsequently handpicked by English novelist Barbara Taylor Bradford to be the male protagonist of the made-for-television film A Secret Affair (1999), based on her 1996 book. In the film, which gained him a large and enthusiastic female following, he starred as Bill Fitzgerald, a war correspondent who falls in love with and pursues Vanessa Stewart (Janine Turner) in Venice although she is engaged, and who is subsequently kidnapped in a war zone.

Other films in which Behan appeared include A Man of No Importance (1994), Conspiracy of Silence (2003) and Veronica Guerin (2003). In the latter film, he played Brian Meehan, who was convicted of murdering Irish crime journalist Veronica Guerin in 1996. In 2006, he appeared in Nick Ryan's short film A Lonely Sky as Jack Reilly, a test pilot who risks his life to break the sound barrier in 1947, but who is forced to question his reasons and abilities by a strange yet familiar man. The ten-minute film won Best Film (Production and Post-Production) at the Digital Media Awards in Dublin in February 2007. Behan appeared in the short film Wake Up (2007), in which he played the lead character Nathan. The film is the first 20 minutes of a proposed feature film.  Most recently, Behan has appeared in the fifth season of the Irish crime drama series Love/Hate (2010). He played the role of Terence May, an Irish drugs supplier based in Spain.

Concerning acting, Behan has been quoted as saying "this is a good business when it's working, but when it's not, it's awful".

2008 police investigation
On 12 July 2008, Behan was questioned by the Carabinieri (Italian military police) in connection with the murder of a 72-year-old woman, Silvana Abate Francescatti, at her home on Monte Amiata, Arcidosso, in Grosseto, Tuscany, Italy. The woman was found on 11 July with 13 stab wounds, including a fatal throat wound, but was believed to have died the previous day. Behan, who had been resident in Arcidosso for part of the year since 2006, was arrested after seeking treatment twice at a hospital near Arcidosso for a cut on his thigh. In an interview with The Irish Times, he claimed he had first gone to the hospital on 10 July after cutting himself in the thigh while unpacking furniture and other objects delivered from the USA. However, hospital staff had mistakenly decided he had been acting suspiciously due to his poor spoken Italian, and the fact that he had expressed annoyance at how the hospital was managed and its bad signage.

Upon returning to the hospital on 12 July for a tetanus injection, Behan was arrested by five policemen and taken to their Arcidosso barracks for questioning. He did not know what was happening at first as the police had no interpreter in the barracks. He was only provided with a lawyer and interpreter 15 hours later when a magistrate from Grosseto came. Behan exercised his right not to answer questions. He was released, but was formally informed that he was under suspicion. As of 15 July 2008 he was the only suspect in the case. The police subsequently seized his car and a knife from his home, and secured a room in the house in which traces of blood were allegedly found. In addition, shoe prints found were said to have matched his footwear. Custody of his car and home (except for the cellar) were returned to him on 14 July by the judge overseeing the investigation.

Speaking on Italian television, Behan denied knowing the victim and maintained his innocence, saying "I've got nothing to hide." He accused the police of subjecting him to "psychological torture" during his detention and threatened to sue them.

In November 2008, Behan was cleared of the crime and allowed full use of his home after a chef named Aldo Staiani was identified as the murderer from DNA retrieved from under Mrs. Abate's fingernails. Behan said, "I don't hold any animosity. It's done now, there is no point in bearing any grudges. I am just glad somebody has finally been caught for this brutal killing."

Selected work

Film

Television

Theatre

Personal life
In addition to his half-sister Blanaid, Paudge Behan has one older half-brother, Cathal Óg (the son of Cathal Goulding and Patty Germaine who married in 1950), and a younger half-brother Aodhgan and half-sister Banbán.

Notes

References

.
.
, retrieved on 18 November 2007.

Further reading
.
.

1965 births
Alumni of RADA
Irish male film actors
Irish male stage actors
Irish male television actors
Irish writers
Living people